The World Cricket League Africa Region or Africa World Cricket League is a one-day cricket tournament organised by the African Cricket Association for non-Test national cricket teams in Africa. As well as providing opportunity for national teams to play international matches against others of a similar standard, it also provides qualification into the ICC World Cricket League.

The league contains three divisions played once every two years with promotion taking place between divisions. As yet, there has not been a Division One tournament played and so there are no current champions. Currently, there is no date set for this to take place.

History
The Africa regional tournament of the World Cricket League was introduced in 2006. Two divisions were played with the teams being distributed according to the final placings of the 2004 ACA Championships. The upper division, designated as Division Two, contained the associate African nations at that time with the exception of Kenya, Namibia and Uganda who were already embedded in the World Cricket League. It is assumed that these three teams are expected to participate in Africa Division One alongside promoted teams from Division Two. Division Three was made up of eight affiliate African nations.

At present, there has been no relegation for teams finishing bottom in the divisions though this may change if the first division is played in the future.

Tournaments

2006

Division Three

The 2006 Division Three tournament featured eight African affiliate members of the International Cricket Council. Pool 1 featured Gambia, Ghana, Lesotho and Malawi whilst Pool 2 featured Morocco, Mozambique, Rwanda and Sierra Leone. It was hosted at the Willowmoore Park cricket complex in Benoni, South Africa and was won by Mozambique, who qualified for Division Two later in the year.

Division Two

The 2006 Division Two tournament was played in Dar-es-Salaam in Tanzania. It was a round-robin tournament, featuring Botswana, Nigeria, Tanzania and Zambia who were joined by Mozambique from the Division Three tournament. Tanzania topped the points table, thus qualifying for Division Three of the World Cricket League. Botswana were runners-up and qualified for Division Five of the World Cricket League, with third placed Mozambique later being invited to join them.

2008

Division Three

In April 2008, the Division Three tournament was again held at the Willowmoore Park cricket complex in Benoni, South Africa. Due to the late withdrawal of Morocco, the tournament featured seven African affiliate members of the International Cricket Council and a South African Invitational team. Pool 1 featured Lesotho, Malawi, Rwanda and Sierra Leone. Whilst Pool 2 featured Gambia, Ghana, Swaziland and the South African Invitation XI. Although the SA Invitation XI won Pool 2 without losing a match, the tournament rules did not allow them to participate in the semi finals and their place was taken by Swaziland (third in Pool 2). After Ghana easily accounted for Rwanda in the first semi-final, they beat Swaziland (who had defeated Sierra Leone in the other semi-final) in the final to win the tournament.

Division Two

In October 2008, the Division Two tournament was held at the Willowmoore Park cricket complex in Benoni, South Africa. The tournament was originally scheduled to be held in September 2008 in Lusaka, Zambia but was rescheduled to South Africa just before the original tournament started due to the death of the Zambian President. The tournament featured three African associate members of the ICC; Botswana, Nigeria and Zambia and three affiliate members; Ghana, Mozambique and Swaziland in a round robin format.

The three associate members proved stronger than their three affiliate competitors, with the final group table reflecting the associate / affiliate split. Botswana were the overall winners after going through the tournament undefeated with Nigeria emerging as the second best and both the teams have been rewarded with promotion to Africa Division One.  Due to their performance in the tournament, Nigeria qualified for Division Seven of the World Cricket League.

2009-10

Division Three

The 2009 Africa Division Three was played from 1–7 October in Malawi. The hosts were joined by four other teams who remained from the previous playing the year before. Morocco were intending to take part as well, but had to pull out as their visas were not accepted. The winners were Malawi who were promoted to Africa Division Two alongside the runners-up Sierra Leone.

Division Two

Africa Division Two took place from 24–29 April 2010. The competition was held in Benoni, South Africa and included Ghana, Malawi, Mozambique, Sierra Leone, Swaziland and Zambia. The winners, Zambia gained entry into 2010 WCL Division Eight.

Division One
The Division One tournament  which includes Botswana, Kenya, Namibia, Nigeria, Tanzania and Uganda was to be held in 2010. However, due to the busy schedule the tournament was shelved.

Champions

Division Two

Division Three

See also
African Cricket Association
 ICC Africa Under-19 Championships

References

 
Africa
Cricket in Africa
Multi-national professional sports leagues